"Please" is a song by Robin Gibb, from the 2003 album Magnet. It was released as a single in only Germany, New Zealand and the UK. The song was edited to 3:59 for its single version.

Track listing
All tracks written by Deconzo Smith and Emmanuel Officer, except where noted.
"Please" (M. Graves, E. Reid) – 3:59
"Watching You" – 3:59
"Don't Rush" – 3:33

Chart performance

References

2002 songs
2003 singles
Robin Gibb songs